Raja Abdullah may refer to:

Raja Abdullah bin Raja Jaafar, a Malay from Riau; participant in the Klang War
Sultan Abdullah Muhammad Shah II Ibni Almarhum Sultan Jaafar Safiuddin Muazzam Shah, Malaysian sultan, one of the parties to the Pangkor Treaty of 1874, later exiled to Seychelles

See also
 Abdullah (name)
 Abdullah (disambiguation)
 Abdullah I (disambiguation)
 Abdullah II (disambiguation)
 King Abdullah (disambiguation)
 Abdullah Khan (disambiguation)